Justice Harrison may refer to:

Albertis Harrison, associate justice of the Virginia Supreme Court of Appeals
George Moffett Harrison, associate justice of the Virginia Supreme Court of Appeals
Horace Harrison, associate justice of the Tennessee Supreme Court
James T. Harrison, associate justice of the Montana Supreme Court
John B. Harrison, associate justice of the Oklahoma Supreme Court
John C. Harrison (judge) (1913–2011), associate justice of the Montana Supreme Court
Moses Harrison, associate justice of the Illinois Supreme Court
Ralph C. Harrison, associate justice of the Supreme Court of California
T. O. C. Harrison, associate justice of the Nebraska Supreme Court
William A. Harrison, associate justice of the Supreme Court of Appeals of West Virginia
William M. Harrison, associate justice of the Arkansas Supreme Court